Geoffrey Lance Amoore (born 3 May 1964) is a former Australian rules footballer who represented the St Kilda Football Club in the Victorian Football League (VFL) during the 1980s.

Originally from the Karingal Football Club, Amoore spent two seasons with the Saints, in which he played in just 5 games, and did not play in a single win in his short VFL career. He later played in the VFA with Frankston. His nickname was Chas.

References

External links

1964 births
Living people
St Kilda Football Club players
Australian rules footballers from Victoria (Australia)